

This is a list of the National Register of Historic Places listings in King County, Washington.

This is intended to be a complete list of the properties and districts on the National Register of Historic Places in King County, Washington, United States. Latitude and longitude coordinates are provided for many National Register properties and districts; these locations may be seen together in an online map.

There are 310 properties and districts listed on the National Register in the county. 219 of these listings are located in the city of Seattle, and are listed separately; the remaining 91 properties and districts are listed here. Another property in the county outside of Seattle was once listed on the National Register but has been removed.

Current listings

|}

Former listings

|}

See also
 List of Landmarks in Seattle (city landmarks)
 National Register of Historic Places listings in Seattle, Washington
 List of landmarks in King County, Washington (county landmarks)
 List of National Historic Landmarks in Washington

References

External links

WASHINGTON - King County at nationalregisterofhistoricplaces.com
WASHINGTON - King County - Historic Districts at nationalregisterofhistoricplaces.com

 
Landmarks in King County, Washington
King